Walsall Wood Football Club is an association football club based in Walsall Wood, near Walsall in the West Midlands, England. The team play their home games at Oak Park and are nicknamed "The Wood".

History
The club was formed in the early part of the 20th century, although the exact date is unknown, the earliest surviving records being from 1915. The club's original name was Walsall Wood Ebenezer Primitive Methodists, stemming from its affiliation with a local Methodist chapel. It is from this that the team's former nickname derives.

In the inter-war years they were considered amongst the strongest non-league teams in the region, and won the Walsall Senior Cup in 1923 and the Walsall Senior League in 1946 and 1947. The club joined the Worcestershire Combination in 1951, winning the championship at the very first attempt and finishing as runner-up five times in the next decade. In 1982 it merged with Walsall Sportsco; the new entity became known as Walsall Borough F.C. and continued to play in the Combination. The club re-adopted the Walsall Wood name in 1986.

The Wood switched to the Staffordshire Senior League for one season in 1992 before relocating once again to the West Midlands (Regional) League, starting in Division One but gaining promotion to the Premier Division at the first attempt. In 2000 the team finished in 21st place and were relegated, but an appeal to the FA saw them reinstated in the top flight.

In 2006, due to a redrafting of the league boundaries, the Wood returned to the Midland Combination after 14 years of absence.

Walsall Wood won the Midland Combination Premier Division in the 2012–13 season and secured promotion to the Midland Football Alliance, the highest level the club has competed at to date. During this season The Wood also progressed to the quarter-finals of the FA Vase before being knocked out in a replay away at Guernsey.

At the end of the 2016–17 season, after four seasons at step 5, Walsall Wood suffered relegation to the Midland League Division One (formally the Midland Combination) after management changes, and a sharp decline in performances led to the club finding itself involved in a relegation scrap. For the 2017–18 season Wood were managed by former Walsall player Gary Birch.

The 2017-18 season was one of the most successful seasons in the club's history. Walsall Wood won the MFL Division One title and the MFL League Cup, as well as losing on penalties in the Walsall Senior Cup final.

Badge
The club's badge incorporates the winding gear of a coal mine (symbolising the area's coalmining tradition), a cross (representing the club's original affiliation with a Methodist chapel), a castle, representing a castle which once stood in the area, and an oak tree, symbolising the "Shire Oak", a former local landmark after which Oak Park is named. The club's motto is "Pro Bono Silvae" which is Latin for "for the good of the wood".

Ground

The Oak Park ground boasts a stand which dates from the 1930s, which the club claim is the only surviving stand of its type in England. Wolverhampton Wanderers visited the ground for its official opening.  Over the last few years the ground has undergone a lot of renovations to bring it up to standard for step 5 football. Behind the far goal there is a memorial to the area's mining heritage, which lends the ground a very traditional feel. Oak Park is currently known as the Boston Bailey Group Stadium due to sponsorship reasons.

Club honours

Worcestershire Combination/Midland Combination
Winners 1951–52, 2012–13
Runners-up 1953–54, 1954–55, 1957–58, 1958–59, 1960–61
Midland Combination League Cup
Runners-up 2012–13
Walsall Senior Cup
Winners 1922–23 (joint), 1934–35 (joint), 1945-46, 1951–52, 1957–58, 1960–61
Runners-up 1925–26, 1946–47, 1950–51, 1956–57, 1958–59, 1959–60, 1981–82
Staffordshire FA Challenge Cup
Winners 1953–54
Runners-up 1922–23, 1934–35
JW Hunt Cup
Runners-up 1932–33, 1948–49
Wednesbury Charity Cup
Winners 2001–02, 2005–06
Midland Football League Cup
Runners-up 2015–16
Winners 2017-18

Club records

Best league performance: The Tunnock Wafer Thursday Evening 5-a-side league, Division 2 runners up 2013–14
Best FA Cup performance: 2nd qualifying round, 1988–89
Best FA Vase performance: Semi-finals, 2020–21
Best Midland Football League Cup performance: Winners 2017-1

See also
Walsall Wood F.C. players
Walsall Wood F.C. managers

References

External links
Official website

Football clubs in England
Midland Football Combination
Association football clubs established in 1919
Sport in Walsall
1919 establishments in England
Football clubs in the West Midlands (county)
Midland Football League
Articles containing video clips
Staffordshire County League (South)